Plato (Plátōn, "wide, broad-shouldered"; c. 428/427 – c. 348/347 BC) was an ancient Greek philosopher, the second of the trio of ancient Greeks including Socrates and Aristotle said to have laid the philosophical foundations of Western culture.

Little can be known about Plato's early life and education due to the very limited accounts. Plato came from one of the wealthiest and most politically active families in Athens. Ancient sources describe him as a bright though modest boy who excelled in his studies. His father contributed everything necessary to give to his son a good education, and Plato therefore must have been instructed in grammar, music, gymnastics and philosophy by some of the most distinguished teachers of his era.

Birthdate and birthplace
The specific birthdate of Plato is not known. Based on ancient sources, most modern scholars estimate that Plato was born between 428 and 427 BC. The grammarian Apollodorus of Athens argues in his Chronicles that Plato was born in the first year of the eighty-eighth Olympiad (427 BC), on the seventh day of the month Thargelion; according to this tradition the god Apollo was born this day. According to another biographer of him, Neanthes, Plato was eighty-four years of age at his death. If we accept Neanthes' version, Plato was younger than Isocrates by six years, and therefore he was born in the second year of the 87th Olympiad, the year Pericles died (429 BC).

The Chronicle of Eusebius names the fourth year of the 89th Olympiad as Plato's, when Stratocles was archon, while the Alexandrian Chronicle mentions the eighty-ninth Olympiad, in the archonship of Isarchus. According to Suda, Plato was born in Aegina in the 88th Olympiad amid the preliminaries of the Peloponnesian war, and he lived 82 years. Sir Thomas Browne also believes that Plato was born in the 88th Olympiad. Renaissance Platonists celebrated Plato's birth on November 7. Ulrich von Wilamowitz-Moellendorff estimates that Plato was born when Diotimos was archon eponymous, namely between July 29 428 BC and July 24 427 BC. Greek philologist Ioannis Kalitsounakis believes that the philosopher was born on May 26 or 27, 427 BC, while Jonathan Barnes regards 428 BC as year of Plato's birth. For her part, Debra Nails asserts that the philosopher was born in 424/423 BC.

Plato's birthplace is also disputed. Diogenes Laërtius states that Plato "was born, according to some writers, in Aegina in the house of Phidiades the son of Thales". Diogenes mentions as one of his sources the Universal History of Favorinus. According to Favorinus, Ariston and his family were sent by Athens to settle as cleruchs (colonists retaining their Athenian citizenship), on the island of Aegina, from which they were expelled by the Spartans after Plato's birth there. Nails points out, however, that there is no record of any Spartan expulsion of Athenians from Aegina between 431 and 411 BC. On the other hand, at the Peace of Nicias, Aegina was silently left under Athens control, and it was not until the summer of 411 that the Spartans overran the island. Therefore, Nails concludes that "perhaps Ariston was a cleruch, perhaps he went to Aegina in 431, and perhaps Plato was born on Aegina, but none of this enables a precise dating of Ariston's death (or Plato's birth)". Aegina is regarded as Plato's place of birth by Suda as well.

Family
Plato's father was Ariston, of the deme of Colytus. According to a tradition, reported by Diogenes Laërtius but disputed by Wilamowitz-Moellendorff, Ariston traced his descent from the king of Athens, Codrus, and the king of Messenia, Melanthus. Codrus himself was a demigod fathered by the God of the sea Poseidon. These claims are not however exploited in the philosopher's dialogues. Plato's mother was Perictione, whose family boasted of a relationship with the famous Athenian lawmaker and lyric poet Solon. Solon's heritage can be traced back to Dropides, Archon of the year 644 b.c. Perictione was sister of Charmides and cousin of Critias, both prominent figures of the Thirty Tyrants, the brief oligarchic regime, which followed on the collapse of Athens at the end of the Peloponnesian war (404–403 BC).<ref name="TW1">W. K. C. Guthrie, A History of Greek Philosophy''', IV, 10* A.E. Taylor, Plato, xiv* U. von Wilamowitz-Moellendorff, Plato, 47</ref>

Besides Plato himself, Ariston and Perictione had three other children; these were two sons, Adeimantus and Glaucon, and a daughter, Potone, the mother of Speusippus (the nephew and successor of Plato as head of his philosophical Academy). According to the Republic, Adeimantus and Glaucon were older than Plato; the two brothers distinguished themselves in the Battle of Megara, when Plato could not have been more than 5 years old. Nevertheless, in his Memorabilia, Xenophon presents Glaucon as younger than Plato.

Ariston appears to have died in Plato's childhood, although the precise dating of his death is difficult. When Ariston died, Athenian law forbade the legal independence of women, and, therefore Perictione was given to marriage to Pyrilampes, her mother's brother (Plato himself calls him the uncle of Charmides), who had served many times as an ambassador to the Persian court and was a friend of Pericles, the leader of the democratic faction in Athens. Pyrilampes had a son from a previous marriage, Demos, who was famous for his beauty. Perictione gave birth to Pyrilampes' second son, Antiphon, the half-brother of Plato, who appears in Parmenides, where he is said to have given up philosophy, in order to devote most of his time to horses. Thus Plato was reared in a household of at least six children, where he was number five: a stepbrother, a sister, two brothers and a half-brother.

In contrast to his reticence about himself, Plato used to introduce his distinguished relatives into his dialogues, or to mention them with some precision: Charmides has one named after him; Critias speaks in both Charmides and Protagoras; Adeimantus and Glaucon take prominent parts in the Republic. From these and other references one can reconstruct his family tree, and this suggests a considerable amount of family pride. According to John Burnet, "the opening scene of the Charmides is a glorification of the whole [family] connection ... Plato's dialogues are not only a memorial to Socrates, but also the happier days of his own family".

 Family tree Note: John Burnet gives Glaucon as Plato's grandfather. Diogenes Laërtius gives Aristocles as Plato's grandfather.

Name
According to Diogenes, the philosopher was named after his grandfather Aristocles, but his wrestling coach, Ariston of Argos, dubbed him "Platon", meaning "broad" on account of his robust figure. Diogenes mentions three sources for the name of Plato (Alexander Polyhistor, Neanthes of Cyzicus and unnamed sources), according to which the philosopher derived his name from the breadth (πλατύτης, platytēs) of his eloquence, or else because he was very wide (πλατύς, platýs) across the forehead. All these sources of Diogenes date from the Alexandrian period of biography which got much of its information from its Peripatetic forerunners. Recent scholars have disputed Diogenes, and argued that Plato was the original name of the philosopher, and that the legend about his name being Aristocles originated in the Hellenistic age. W. K. C. Guthrie points out that Ρlato was a common name in ancient Greece, of which 31 instances are known at Athens alone.

Legends
According to certain fabulous reports of ancient writers, Plato's mother became pregnant from a divine vision: Ariston tried to force his attentions on Perictione, but failed of his purpose; then the ancient Greek god Apollo appeared to him in a vision, and, as a result of it, Ariston left Perictione unmolested. When she had given birth to Plato, only then did her husband lie with her. Another legend related that, while he was sleeping as an infant on Mount Hymettus in a bower of myrtles (his parents were sacrificing to the Muses and Nymphs), bees had settled on the lips of Plato; an augury of the sweetness of style in which he would discourse philosophy.

Education

Apuleius informs us that Speusippus praised Plato's quickness of mind and modesty as a boy, and the "first fruits of his youth infused with hard work and love of study". Later Plato himself would characterize as gifts of nature the facility in learning, the memory, the sagacity, the quickness of apprehension and their accompaniments, the youthful spirit and the magnificence in soul. According to Diogenes, Plato's education, like any other Athenian boy's, was physical as well as mental; he was instructed in grammar (that is, reading and writing), music, painting, and gymnastics by the most distinguished teachers of his time. He excelled so much in physical exercises that Dicaearchus went so far as to say, in the first volume of his Lives, that Plato wrestled at the Isthmian games and did extremely well and was well known. Apuleius argues that the philosopher went also into a public contest at the Pythian games. Plato had also attended courses of philosophy; before meeting Socrates, he first became acquainted with Cratylus (a disciple of Heraclitus, a prominent pre-Socratic Greek philosopher) and the Heraclitean doctrines.

According to the ancient writers, there was a tradition that Plato's favorite employment in his youthful years was poetry. He wrote poems, dithyrambs at first, and afterwards lyric poems and tragedies (a tetralogy), but abandoned his early passion and burnt his poems when he met Socrates and turned to philosophy. There was also a story that on the day Plato was entrusted to him, Socrates said that a swan had been delivered to him. There are also some epigrams attributed to Plato, but these are now thought by some scholars to be spurious. Modern scholars now believe that Plato was probably a young boy when he became acquainted with Socrates. This assessment is based on the fact that Critias and Charmides, two close relatives of Plato, were both friends of Socrates.

Public affairs

According to the Seventh Letter, whose authenticity has been disputed, as Plato came of age, he imagined for himself a life in public affairs. He was actually invited by the regime of the Thirty Tyrants (Critias and Charmides were among their leaders) to join the administration, but he held back; he hoped that under the new leadership the city would return to justice, but he was soon repelled by the violent acts of the regime. He was particularly disappointed, when the Thirty attempted to implicate Socrates in their seizure of the democratic general Leon of Salamis for summary execution.

In 403 BC, the democracy was restored after the regrouping of the democrats in exile, who entered the city through the Piraeus and met the forces of the Thirty at the Battle of Munychia, where both Critias and Charmides were killed. In 401 BC the restored democrats raided Eleusis and killed the remaining oligarchic supporters, suspecting them of hiring mercenaries. After the overthrow of the Thirty, Plato's desire to become politically active was rekindled, but Socrates' condemnation to death put an end to his plans. Socrates' final words to Plato were: "What's more influential, the created or the creator?". Plato led his voyage through Sicily, Egypt, and Italy guided by this question.  In 399 BC, Plato and other Socratic men took temporary refuge at Megara with Euclid, founder of the Megarian school of philosophy.

According to Diogenes Laërtius, throughout his later life, Plato became entangled with the politics of the city of Syracuse.  Plato initially visited Syracuse while it was under the rule of Dionysius. During this first trip Dionysius's brother-in-law, Dion of Syracuse, became one of Plato's disciples, but the tyrant himself turned against Plato. Plato almost faced death, but he was sold into slavery. Anniceris, a Cyrenaic philosopher, subsequently bought Plato's freedom for twenty minas, and sent him home. After Dionysius's death, according to Plato's Seventh Letter, Dion requested Plato return to Syracuse to tutor Dionysius II and guide him to become a philosopher king. Dionysius II seemed to accept Plato's teachings, but he became suspicious of Dion, his uncle. Dionysius expelled Dion and kept Plato against his will. Eventually Plato left Syracuse. Dion would return to overthrow Dionysius and ruled Syracuse for a short time before being usurped by Calippus, a fellow disciple of Plato.

Death
According to Seneca, Plato died at the age of 81 on the same day he was born. The Suda indicates that he lived to 82 years, while Neanthes claims an age of 84. A variety of sources have given accounts of his death. One story, based on a mutilated manuscript, suggests Plato died in his bed, whilst a young Thracian girl played the flute to him. Another tradition suggests Plato died at a wedding feast. The account is based on Diogenes Laërtius's reference to an account by Hermippus, a third-century Alexandrian. According to Tertullian, Plato simply died in his sleep.

Notes

Citations

References

Primary sources (Greek and Roman)

 Apuleius, De Dogmate Platonis, I. See original text in Latin Library.
  See original text in Perseus program.
 . See original text in Perseus program.
 , I, See original text in Latin library.
 .
 . See original text in Perseus program.
  See original text in Perseus program.
  See original text in Perseus program.
 . See original text in Perseus program.
  See original text in Perseus program.
  See original text in Perseus program.
 , V, VIII. See original text in Perseus program.
  See original text in Perseus program.
 Xenophon, Memorabilia. See original text in Perseus program''.

Secondary sources

 
 
 
 
 
 
 
 
 
 
 
 
 
 
 
 
 
 

Plato
Plato
Ancient Aegina